The 1957–58 daytime network television schedule for the three major English-language commercial broadcast networks in the United States covers the weekday daytime hours from September 1957 to August 1958.

Talk shows are highlighted in  yellow, local programming is white, reruns of prime-time programming are orange, game shows are pink, soap operas are chartreuse, news programs are gold and all others are light blue. New series are highlighted in bold.

Monday-Friday

ABC note: * These series aired under the umbrella title Fun At Five.
NBC note: ^ Comedy Time featured repeats of Private Secretary, The Charlie Farrell Show and Blondie, Then in the Winter, Comedy Time featured repeats of Dear Phoebe, I Married Joan, and The Charlie Farrell Show, Finally in Spring, Comedy Time featured repeats of Blondie (1957 TV series), I Married Joan and The Charlie Farrell Show.

Saturday

Sunday

See also
1957-58 United States network television schedule (prime-time)
1957-58 United States network television schedule (late night)

Sources
https://web.archive.org/web/20071015122215/http://curtalliaume.com/abc_day.html
https://web.archive.org/web/20071015122235/http://curtalliaume.com/cbs_day.html
https://web.archive.org/web/20071012211242/http://curtalliaume.com/nbc_day.html
Castleman & Podrazik, The TV Schedule Book, McGraw-Hill Paperbacks, 1984

United States weekday network television schedules
1957 in American television
1958 in American television